Shirley Mae Jones (born March 31, 1934) is an American actress and singer. In her six decades in show business, she has starred as wholesome characters in a number of musical films, such as Oklahoma! (1955), Carousel (1956), and The Music Man (1962). She won the Academy Award for Best Supporting Actress for playing a vengeful prostitute in Elmer Gantry (1960). She played the lead role of Shirley Partridge, the widowed mother of five children, in the musical situation-comedy television series The Partridge Family (1970–1974), which co-starred her real-life stepson, David Cassidy, son of Jack Cassidy.

Early life
Jones was born on March 31, 1934, in Charleroi, Pennsylvania, to Methodist parents Marjorie (née Williams), a homemaker, and Paul Jones, owners of the Jones Brewing Company. Jones' paternal grandfather came from Wales. She was named after child star Shirley Temple.

Jones says that many people have incorrectly assumed that her middle name was named after vaudeville and film legend Mae West, but Jones was actually named after her aunt. Coincidentally, the first star Jones ever met was West, who was performing at the Twin Coaches supper club in Rostraver around 1954.

The family later moved to the small nearby town of Smithton, Pennsylvania. Jones began singing at the age of six in the Methodist Church choir and took voice lessons from Ralph Lewando. Upon attending South Huntingdon High School in Ruffs Dale, Pennsylvania, she participated in school plays.

Jones won the Miss Pittsburgh contest in 1952.

Career

Early stage career

Her first audition was for an open bi-weekly casting call held by John Fearnley, casting director for Rodgers and Hammerstein and their various musicals. At the time, Jones had never heard of Rodgers and Hammerstein. Fearnley was so impressed, he ran across the street to fetch Richard Rodgers, who was rehearsing with an orchestra for an upcoming musical. Rodgers then called Oscar Hammerstein at home. The two saw great potential in Jones. She became the first and only singer to be put under personal contract with the songwriters. They first cast her in a minor role in South Pacific. For her second Broadway show, Me and Juliet, she started as a chorus girl, and then an understudy for the lead role, earning rave reviews in Chicago.

Movie actress of the 1950s and 1960s
Jones impressed Rodgers and Hammerstein with her musically trained voice, and was cast as the female lead in the film adaptation Oklahoma! in 1955. Other film musicals quickly followed, including Carousel (1956), April Love (1957), and The Music Man (1962), in which she was often typecast as a wholesome, kind character. However, she won a 1960 Academy Award for her performance in Elmer Gantry portraying a woman corrupted by the title character played by Burt Lancaster. Her character becomes a prostitute who encounters her seducer years later and reveals his true character. The director, Richard Brooks, had originally fought against her being in the movie, but after seeing her first scene, told her she would win an Oscar for her performance. She was reunited with Ron Howard (who had played her brother in The Music Man) in The Courtship of Eddie's Father (1963). Jones landed the role of a lady who fell in love with the professor in Fluffy (1965).

In her film career, she has worked with some of Hollywood's icons: Jimmy Stewart, Gene Kelly, Marlon Brando, James Cagney, Henry Fonda, Frank Sinatra, Dean Martin and director John Ford.

The Partridge Family

In 1970, after turning down the role of Carol Brady on The Brady Bunch, a role that ultimately went to her best friend, Florence Henderson, Jones was the producers' first choice to audition for the lead role of Shirley Partridge in The Partridge Family, an ABC musical sitcom based loosely on the real-life musical family The Cowsills. The series focused on a young widowed mother whose five children form a pop rock group after the entire family painted its signature bus to travel. She was convinced that the combination of music and comedy would be a surefire hit. Jones realized, however, that:

During its first season, it became a hit and was screened in over 70 countries. Within months, Jones and her co-stars were pop culture television icons. Her real-life 20-year-old stepson David Cassidy, who was an unknown actor at the time, played Shirley Partridge's eldest son Keith and became a teen idol. The show also spawned a number of albums and singles by The Partridge Family, performed by David Cassidy and Shirley Jones. That same year, "I Think I Love You" reached number one on the Billboard Hot 100 music chart, making Jones the second person, after Frank Sinatra, and the first woman to win an acting Oscar and also have a number-one hit on that chart, an achievement only matched by Cher and Barbra Streisand (Cher had already topped the singles chart with I Got You Babe in 1965, but did not win her Oscar until 1987). The Partridge Family won a NARM award for the best-selling single of the year in 1970 for their hit "I Think I Love You". In 1971, The Partridge Family was nominated for a Grammy under the Best New Artist category.

By 1974, it was one of six series to be canceled that year (along with Room 222, The F.B.I., The Brady Bunch, Owen Marshall: Counselor at Law, and Here's Lucy) to make room for new shows.

Shirley Jones's friendship with David Cassidy's family began in the mid-to-late 1950s, when David was just six, after he learned about his father's divorce from his mother Evelyn Ward. Upon David's first meeting with Shirley before co-starring with her on The Partridge Family, he said, "The day he tells me that they're divorced, he tells me, 'We're remarried, and let me introduce you to my new wife.' He was thrilled when her first film, Oklahoma! (1955), had come out; and my dad took me to see it—I just see her, and I go, uh-oh, it doesn't really quite register with me, 'cause I'm in total shock, because I wanted to hate her, but the instant that I met her, I got the essence of her. She's a very warm, open, sweet, good human being. She couldn't have thawed it for me—the coldness and the ice—any more than she did." Shirley was shocked to hear her real-life stepson was going to audition for the role of Keith Partridge. David said, "At the auditions, they introduced me to the lead actress [Shirley Jones] 'cause they had no idea, they had no idea. So I said, 'What are you doing here?' She looked at me and said, 'What are you doing here?' And I said, 'Well, I'm reading for the lead guy.' I said, 'What are you doing here?' She said, 'I'm the mother!'" Cassidy discussed his relationship with his stepmother on the show: "She wasn't my mother, and I can be very open, and we can speak, and we became very close friends. She was a very good role model for me, watching the way, you know, she dealt with people on the set, and watching people revere her."

Cassidy appeared on many shows alongside his stepmother, including A&E Biography, TV Land Confidential, and The Today Show, and he was one of the presenters of his stepmother's Intimate Portrait on Lifetime Television, and the reality show pilot In Search of the Partridge Family, where he served as co-executive producer. The rest of the cast also celebrated the 25th, 30th, and 35th anniversaries of The Partridge Family (although Cassidy was unavailable to attend the 25th anniversary in 1995 owing to other commitments). In addition, Jack Cassidy's death in 1976 drew Jones and Cassidy closer as Shirley's three children and stepson mourned their father.

Shirley and other projects
In 1979, Jones tried her hand at television for the second time, starring in the NBC show Shirley, which, like The Partridge Family, featured a family headed by a widowed mother, but the show failed to win ratings and was cancelled toward the middle of the season. Jones also played the "older woman" girlfriend of Drew Carey's character in several episodes of The Drew Carey Show, and reprised Shirley Partridge in a cameo in a 2000 episode of That '70s Show.

She was also in the dramatic project There Were Times, Dear, in which she played a loyal wife whose husband is dying of Alzheimer's disease; she was nominated for an Emmy Award for this work.

In February 1986, Jones unveiled her star on the Hollywood Walk of Fame on Vine Street just around the corner from Hollywood Boulevard. In 1983, she appeared in a rare revival of Noël Coward's operetta, Bitter Sweet. In 2004, she returned to Broadway in a revival of 42nd Street, portraying diva Dorothy Brock opposite Patrick Cassidy, the first time a mother and son were known to star together on Broadway. In July 2005, Jones revisited the musical Carousel onstage in Massachusetts, portraying "Cousin Nettie".

In July 2006, Jones received another Emmy Award nomination for her supporting performance in the television film Hidden Places. She was nominated for a Screen Actors Guild award for the same film but lost to Helen Mirren for Elizabeth I. She also appeared in Grandma's Boy (2006) as a nymphomaniac senior citizen. On November 16, 2007, she took the stage at the Ford Center in Oklahoma City, Oklahoma, during the Oklahoma Centennial Spectacular concert that celebrated the state's 100th birthday. Jones sang the songs "Oklahoma!" and "People Will Say We're In Love" from the musical Oklahoma!.

In early 2008, it was announced that Jones would play Colleen Brady on the long-running NBC soap opera Days of Our Lives. Jones guest-starred on ABC Family's short-lived show Ruby & The Rockits as David and Patrick's mother.

In 2008, U.K. label Stage Door Records released the retrospective collection Then & Now featuring 24 songs from Jones's musical career, including songs from the films Oklahoma!, Carousel, and April Love. The album featured new recordings of songs including "Beauty and the Beast", "Memory", and a sentimental tribute to The Music Man. She had a recurring role as Burt Chance's mother in the Fox TV comedy series Raising Hope.

In mid-2012, Jones played Mrs. Paroo, when her son Patrick played Harold Hill, in a California Musical Theatre revival of The Music Man.

In 2014, Jones guest-starred on an episode of General Hospital as Mrs. McClain.

Personal life

On August 5, 1956, Jones married actor and singer Jack Cassidy. They had three sons, Shaun, Patrick, and Ryan. David Cassidy was Jack's son from his first marriage, to actress Evelyn Ward, and became her stepson. Jones divorced Cassidy in 1975. She married actor and comedian Marty Ingels on November 13, 1977. Jones and Ingels wrote an autobiography based on their relationship called Shirley & Marty: An Unlikely Love Story. Despite drastically different personalities and separations (she filed, then withdrew, a divorce petition in 2002), they remained married until Ingels' death on October 21, 2015, from a massive stroke. After his death, Jones said: "He often drove me crazy, but there's not a day I won’t miss him and love him to my core."

Jones was friends with her co-star Gordon MacRae and his ex-wife Sheila, and he was named godfather to her first son, Shaun. She also admitted that she had a crush on MacRae and was starstruck when she worked opposite him on Oklahoma!   She says it was she who convinced MacRae to take the part as Billy Bigelow in Carousel, where they worked together for a second time.  Frank Sinatra had originally been cast, but dropped out during the first days of filming because each scene had to be shot twice, once in CinemaScope 55 (a wider-than-usual, 55-mm, 6-track stereo system) and once in 35-mm CinemaScope. Sinatra felt that he should have been paid twice because technically he was shooting two films. Three weeks after he left, they found a way to film the scene once on 55-mm, then transfer it onto 35-mm.

On the evening of December 11, 1976, after Jones had refused an offer of reconciliation from Jack Cassidy, she received news that her ex-husband's penthouse apartment was on fire. Apparently, the fire started from his lit cigarette when he fell asleep on the couch; the following morning, firefighters found Cassidy's body inside the gutted apartment. Jack "wanted to come back (to me) right up to the day he died", Jones said in a 1983 newspaper interview. "And as I realized later, I wanted him. That's the terrible part. Much as I love Marty and have a wonderful relationship—I'd say this with Marty sitting here—I'm not sure if Jack were alive I'd be married to Marty." Jones was 20 years old when she met Cassidy, who was eight years her senior, and she refers to him as the most influential person in and the love of her life.

Jones is a supporter of PETA.

Jones is the grandmother of ten: Caitlin, Jake, Juliet, Caleb, Roan, Lila, and Mairin Cassidy by son Shaun; Cole and Jack by son Patrick; and Meghan Mae by son Ryan Cassidy.  Her grandson, Jack, was a contestant on the singing competition television show The Voice in 2017.

Jones was devastated when Suzanne Crough died on April 27, 2015; Crough played one of her TV daughters on The Partridge Family. She had a very close relationship with the younger actress and remained close friends long after the series was cancelled, and regularly would send cards and birthday presents for Crough and her children. Jones said of Crough's death on Hollywood Life:

With regard to David Cassidy's alcohol abuse and legal problems, Jones once shared her family's related concerns: David Cassidy died on November 21, 2017. The day after his death, Jones commented publicly:

Filmography

Film

Television

1950: Fireside Theatre (acting debut)
1952: Gruen Guild Playhouse
1956: Ford Star Jubilee
1956: Playhouse 90
1957: Lux Video Theatre
1957: The Pat Boone Chevy Showroom (guest)
1957: The United States Steel Hour
1958: DuPont Show of the Month
1959: Make Room for Daddy (as herself)
1964: Bob Hope Presents the Chrysler Theatre
1969: Silent Night, Lonely Night
1969: The Carol Burnett Show
1969: The Name of the Game
1970–74: The Partridge Family
1971: Curiosity Shop (Episode: The Curiosity Shop Special)
1973: The Girls of Huntington House
1975: The Family Nobody Wanted
1975: The Lives of Jenny Dolan
1975: Winner Take All
1977: McMillan & Wife
1977: Yesterday's Child
1978: Evening in Byzantium
1978: Who'll Save Our Children?
1979: A Last Cry for Help
1979–80: Shirley
1980: The Children of An Lac
1981: Inmates: A Love Story
1982: The Adventures of Pollyanna
1983/87: Hotel
1983: Hotel (pilot)
1983: The Love Boat
1988/90: Murder, She Wrote
1989: Charlie (unsold pilot)
1997: Dog's Best Friend
1998: Melrose Place
1998: The Drew Carey Show
1999: Sabrina the Teenage Witch
2000: That '70s Show (cameo)
2003: Law & Order: Special Victims Unit
2006: Hidden Places
2006: Monarch Cove
2008: Days of Our Lives
2009: Ruby & The Rockits
2011/14: Raising Hope (3 episodes)
2012: Good Luck Charlie (Episodes: "Welcome Home", "A Duncan Christmas")
2012: Victorious (Episode: "Car, Rain, and Fire")
2013: Cougar Town
2013: Hot in Cleveland
2014: General Hospital
2014: Over the Garden Wall (voice)
2016: Childrens Hospital (cameo as herself)

Stage

1953: South Pacific (Broadway)
1954: Me and Juliet (Chicago)
1956: Oklahoma! (European tour with Jack Cassidy)
1957: The Beggar's Opera (with Cassidy)
1959: Wish You Were Here! (Dallas State Fair Theater, with Cassidy)
1966: The Sound of Music (Westbury Music Fair)
1967: Wait Until Dark (with Cassidy)
1968: Maggie Flynn (Broadway, with Cassidy)
1972: The Marriage Band (with Cassidy)
1974: On a Clear Day You Can See Forever
1976: Show Boat
1977: The Sound of Music
1982: Bitter Sweet
1994: Love Letters (with Marty Ingels)
1994: The King and I
1994: A Christmas Carol
1995: Love Letters (with Marty Ingels)
2004: 42nd Street (Broadway, with Patrick Cassidy)
2005: Carousel
2012: The Music Man (Sacramento Music Circus, with Patrick Cassidy)

Discography

Shirley Jones and Jack Cassidy albums
 Speaking of Love (1957) (Columbia Records)
 Brigadoon (1957) (Columbia Records)
 With Love from Hollywood (1958) (Columbia Records)
 Marriage Type Love (1959) (RCA Records, unreleased)
 Maggie Flynn (1968) (RCA Records)
 Show Tunes (1995) (Sony Music)
 Essential Masters (2011) (Master Classics Records)
 Marriage Type Love (2014) (Columbia Masterworks)

The Partridge Family albums
 The Partridge Family Album (1970) (Bell Records)
 Up To Date (1971) (Bell Records)
 Sound Magazine (1971) (Bell Records)
 A Partridge Family Christmas Card (1971) (Bell Records)
 Shopping Bag (1972) (Bell Records)
 At Home With Their Greatest Hits (1972) (Bell Records)
 Notebook (1972) (Bell Records)
 Crossword Puzzle (1973) (Bell Records)
 Bulletin Board (1973) (Bell Records)
 The World of the Partridge Family (1974) (Bell Records)
 Greatest Hits (1989) (Arista Records)
 The Definitive Collection (2001) (Arista Records)
 Come On Get Happy!: The Very Best of The Partridge Family (2005) (Arista Records)

The Partridge Family singles
 "I Think I Love You" (1970) (Bell Records)
 "Doesn't Somebody Want to Be Wanted" (1971) (Bell Records)
 "I'll Meet You Halfway" (1971) (Bell Records)
 "I Woke Up In Love This Morning" (1971) (Bell Records)
 "It's One of Those Nights (Yes Love)" (1972) (Bell Records)
 "Am I Losing You" (1972) (Bell Records)
 "Breaking Up Is Hard to Do" (1972) (Bell Records)
 "Looking Through the Eyes of Love" (1972) (Bell Records)
 "Friend and a Lover" (1973) (Bell Records)
 "Walking in the Rain" (1973) Bell Records
 "Looking For a Good Time" (1973) (Bell Records)

Shirley Jones albums
 Silent Strength (1989) (Diadem Records)
 Shirley (1992) A & M Records
 Shirley Jones (2000) (Ingels Ent. Records)
 Then & Now (2008) (Stage Door Records)
 A Touch of Christmas (2009) (Encore Music Presents Records)
 A Tribute to Richard Rodgers (2010) (Encore Music Presents Records)

Shirley Jones singles
 "Clover in the Meadow" b/w "Give me a Gentle Girl" (1957) (Dot Records) from April Love movie soundtrack
 "Pepe" b/w "Lovely Day" (1960) (Colpix Records) from Pepe movie soundtrack (This record hit the top 5 in Spain, 1961, on the Discophon label)
 "I've Still Got My Heart Joe" b/w "Everybody's Reachin' Out for Someone" (1971) (Bell Records 119)
 "Ain't Love Easy" b/w "Roses in the Snow" (1972) (Bell Records 253)
 "Walk in Silence" b/w "The World is a Circle" (1973) (Bell Records 350)

Soundtracks
 Oklahoma! (1955) (Capitol Records) (songs: "The Surrey with the Fringe on Top", "Many a New Day", "People Will Say We're in Love", "Out of My Dreams", "Oklahoma")
 Carousel (1956) (Capitol Records) (songs: "You're A Queer One, Julie Jordan", "If I Loved You", "What's The Use Of Wond'rin", "You'll Never Walk Alone")
 April Love (1957) (Dot Records) (songs: "Give Me A Gentle Girl", "April Love" with Pat Boone, "Do It Yourself" with Pat Boone, "The Bentonville Fair" with Pat Boone, "Finale" with Pat Boone)
 Never Steal Anything Small (1959) (song: "I Haven't Got a Thing to Wear")
 Pepe (1960) Colpix Records (songs: "Pepe", "Lovely Day")
 The Music Man (1962) (Warner Bros. Records) (songs: "Piano Lesson / If You Don't Mind My Saying So", "Goodnight, My Someone", "Being in Love", "Lida Rose/Will I Ever Tell You", "Till There Was You")
 Endless Night (1972) (song: "Endless Night")
 Manna from Heaven (2002) (song: "Just the Way You Look Tonight")
 Christmas Is Here Again (2007) (songs: "Easy To Dream", "All Because of Me")
 Over the Garden Wall (2014) (song: "One Is a Bird”)

Album appearances
 Free to Be... You and Me (1972) (Bell Records) (song: "Girl Land" with Jack Cassidy)
 The Christmas Album.....A Gift of Hope (1991) Children's Hospital Benefit Album (song: "Silver Bells" with Shaun Cassidy)
 An Evening with Rodgers & Hammerstein, The Sullivan Years (1993) TVT Records
 Embraceable You – Broadway In Love (1993) (Sony Music)
 George & Ira Gershwin, A Musical Celebration (1994) (MCA Records) (song: "Someone to watch over Me")
 Lerner, Loewe, Lane & Friends (1998) Varèse Sarabande Records (song: "Before I Gaze at You Again")

References

Crossword Heaven

Further reading

External links

 
 
 
 
 
 
 
 Shirley Jones interview
 
Shirley Jones and Marty Ingels discuss their 9/11 memorial park, September, 2015

1934 births
20th-century American actresses
21st-century American actresses
Actresses from Pittsburgh
American people of Welsh descent
American film actresses
American musical theatre actresses
American soap opera actresses
American sopranos
American stage actresses
American television actresses
American television personalities
American women television personalities
Best Supporting Actress Academy Award winners
California Republicans
Living people
Musicians from Pittsburgh
Pennsylvania Republicans
People from Washington County, Pennsylvania
People from Charleroi, Pennsylvania
Bell Records artists
Columbia Records artists
RCA Records artists
A&M Records artists
20th-century American singers
21st-century American singers
Singers from Pennsylvania
American United Methodists
20th-century American women singers
21st-century American women singers